João Amazonas de Souza Pedros (January 1, 1912 – May 27, 2002) was a Brazilian Marxist theoretician, revolutionary, guerrilla member and leader of the Communist Party of Brazil.

He was born on January 1, 1912, in the Paraense capital, Belém, and died in São Paulo on May 27, 2002.

Amazonas was national president of PCdoB, from 1962 to 2001.

External links
 Brief bio (Portuguese language).
 Diário Vermelho (Especial João Amazonas) (Portuguese language).

1912 births
2002 deaths
People from Belém
Communist Party of Brazil politicians
Brazilian communists
Anti-revisionists